The 1997–98 Macedonian Second Football League was the sixth season since its establishment. It began in August 1997 and ended in May 1998.

East

Participating teams

League standing

West

Participating teams

League standing

See also
1997–98 Macedonian Football Cup
1997–98 Macedonian First Football League

References

External links
Football Federation of Macedonia 
MacedonianFootball.com 

Macedonia 2
2
Macedonian Second Football League seasons